United States attorneys are officials of the U.S. Department of Justice who serve as the chief federal law enforcement officers in each of the 94 U.S. federal judicial districts. Each U.S. attorney serves as the United States' chief federal criminal prosecutor in their judicial district and represents the U.S. federal government in civil litigation in federal and state court within their geographic jurisdiction. U.S. attorneys must be nominated by the President and confirmed by the Senate, after which they serve four-year terms.

Currently, there are 93 U.S. attorneys in 94 district offices located throughout the United States, Puerto Rico, the U.S. Virgin Islands, Guam, and the Northern Mariana Islands. One U.S. attorney is assigned to each of the judicial districts, with the exception of Guam and the Northern Mariana Islands, where a single U.S. attorney serves both districts. Each U.S. attorney is the chief federal law enforcement officer within a specified jurisdiction, acting under the guidance of the United States Attorneys' Manual.  They supervise district offices with as many as 350 assistant U.S. attorneys (AUSAs) and as many as 350 support personnel.

U.S. Attorney's Offices are staffed mainly by assistant U.S. Attorneys (AUSA). Often colloquially called "federal prosecutors", assistant U.S. attorneys are government lawyers who act as prosecutors in federal criminal trials and as the United States federal government's lawyers in civil litigation in which the United States is a party. In carrying out their duties as prosecutors, AUSAs have the authority to investigate persons, issue subpoenas, file formal criminal charges, plea bargain with defendants, and grant immunity to witnesses and accused criminals.

U.S. attorneys and their offices are part of the Department of Justice. U.S. attorneys receive oversight, supervision, and administrative support services through the Justice Department's Executive Office for United States Attorneys. Selected U.S. attorneys participate in the Attorney General's Advisory Committee of United States Attorneys.

History and statutory authority
The Office of the United States Attorney was created by the Judiciary Act of 1789, along with the office of Attorney General and United States Marshal. The same act also specified the structure of the Supreme Court of the United States and established inferior courts making up the United States Federal Judiciary,  including  a district court system.  Thus, the office of U.S. Attorney is older than the Department of Justice.  The Judiciary Act of 1789  provided for the appointment in each judicial district of a "Person learned in the law to act as attorney for the United States...whose duty it shall be to prosecute in each district all delinquents for crimes and offenses cognizable under the authority of the United States, and all civil actions in which the United States shall be concerned..."
Prior to the existence of the Department of Justice, the U.S. attorneys were independent of the Attorney General, and did not come under the AG's supervision and authority until 1870, with the creation of the Department of Justice.

Appointment
U.S. attorneys are appointed by the President of the United States for a term of four years, with appointments subject to confirmation by the Senate.  A U.S. attorney continues in office, beyond the appointed term, until a successor is appointed and qualified.  By law, each United States attorney is subject to removal by the President. The Attorney General has had the authority since 1986 to appoint interim U.S. attorneys to fill a vacancy.

United States attorneys controversy

The governing statute,  provided, up until March 9, 2006:
 (c) A person appointed as United States attorney under this section may serve until the earlier of—
(1) the qualification of a United States attorney for such district appointed by the President under section 541 of this title; or
(2) the expiration of 120 days after appointment by the Attorney General under this section.
(d) If an appointment expires under subsection (c)(2), the district court for such district may appoint a United States attorney to serve until the vacancy is filled. The order of appointment by the court shall be filed with the clerk of the court.
On March 9, 2006, President George W. Bush signed into law the USA PATRIOT and Terrorism Prevention Reauthorization Act of 2005 which amended Section 546 by striking subsections (c) and (d) and inserting the following new subsection:
 (c) A person appointed as United States attorney under this section may serve until the qualification of a United States Attorney for such district appointed by the President under section 541 of this title.
This, in effect, extinguished the 120-day limit on interim U.S. attorneys, and their appointment had an indefinite term. If the president failed to put forward any nominee to the Senate, then the Senate confirmation process was avoided, as the Attorney General-appointed interim U.S. attorney could continue in office without limit or further action.  Related to the dismissal of U.S. attorneys controversy, in March 2007 the Senate and the House voted to re-instated the 120-day term limit on interim attorneys. The bill was signed by President George W. Bush, and became law in June 2007.

History of interim U.S. attorney appointments
Senator Dianne Feinstein (D, California), summarized the history of interim United States Attorney appointments, on March 19, 2007 in the Senate.

Role of U.S. attorneys
The U.S. attorney is both the primary representative and the administrative head of the Office of the U.S. Attorney for the district. The U.S. Attorney's Office (USAO) is the chief prosecutor for the United States in criminal law cases, and represents the United States in civil law cases as either the defendant or plaintiff, as appropriate.  However, they are not the only ones that may represent the United States in Court.  In certain circumstances, using an action called a qui tam, any U.S. citizen, provided they are represented by an attorney, can represent the interests of the United States, and share in penalties assessed against guilty parties.

As chief federal law enforcement officers, U.S. attorneys have authority over all federal law enforcement personnel within their districts and may direct them to engage, cease or assist in investigations. In practice, this has involved command of Federal Bureau of Investigation assets but also includes other agencies under the Department of Justice, such as the Bureau of Alcohol, Tobacco and Firearms and Drug Enforcement Administration. Additionally, U.S. attorneys cooperate with other non-DOJ law enforcement agencies – such as the United States Secret Service and Immigration and Customs Enforcement – to prosecute cases relevant to their jurisdictional areas.

The U.S. attorney for the District of Columbia has the additional responsibility of prosecuting local criminal cases in the Superior Court of the District of Columbia, the equivalent of a municipal court for the national capital. The Superior Court is a federal Article I court.

Executive Office for United States Attorneys

The Executive Office for United States Attorneys (EOUSA) provides the administrative support for the 93 United States attorneys (encompassing 94 United States Attorney offices, as the Guam and the Northern Mariana Islands has a single U.S. attorney for both districts), including:
 General executive assistance and direction,
 Policy development,
 Administrative management direction and oversight,
 Operational support,
 Coordination with other components of the United States Department of Justice and other federal agencies.

These responsibilities include certain legal, budgetary, administrative, and personnel services, as well as legal education.

The EOUSA was created on April 6, 1953, by Attorney General Order No. 8-53 to provide for close liaison between the Department of Justice in Washington, DC, and the 93 U.S. attorneys located throughout the 50 states, the District of Columbia, Guam, the Northern Mariana Islands, Puerto Rico, and the U.S. Virgin Islands.  It was organized by Ninth Circuit Court of Appeals judge James R. Browning, who also served as its first chief.

List of current U.S. attorneys' offices

U.S. Attorney for the Middle District of Alabama
U.S. Attorney for the Northern District of Alabama
U.S. Attorney for the Southern District of Alabama
U.S. Attorney for the District of Alaska
U.S. Attorney for the District of Arizona
U.S. Attorney for the Eastern District of Arkansas
U.S. Attorney for the Western District of Arkansas
U.S. Attorney for the Central District of California
U.S. Attorney for the Eastern District of California
U.S. Attorney for the Northern District of California (USAO)
U.S. Attorney for the Southern District of California
U.S. Attorney for the District of Colorado
U.S. Attorney for the District of Columbia
U.S. Attorney for the District of Connecticut
U.S. Attorney for the District of Delaware 
U.S. Attorney for the Middle District of Florida (USAO)
U.S. Attorney for the Northern District of Florida
U.S. Attorney for the Southern District of Florida (USAO)
U.S. Attorney for the Middle District of Georgia
U.S. Attorney for the Northern District of Georgia
U.S. Attorney for the Southern District of Georgia
U.S. Attorney for the Districts of Guam and the Northern Mariana Islands (USAO)
U.S. Attorney for the District of Hawaii (USAO)
U.S. Attorney for the District of Idaho
U.S. Attorney for the Central District of Illinois
U.S. Attorney for the Northern District of Illinois
U.S. Attorney for the Southern District of Illinois
U.S. Attorney for the Northern District of Indiana (USAO)
U.S. Attorney for the Southern District of Indiana
U.S. Attorney for the Northern District of Iowa
U.S. Attorney for the Southern District of Iowa (USAO)
U.S. Attorney for the District of Kansas
U.S. Attorney for the Eastern District of Kentucky
U.S. Attorney for the Western District of Kentucky
U.S. Attorney for the Eastern District of Louisiana
U.S. Attorney for the Middle District of Louisiana
U.S. Attorney for the Western District of Louisiana
U.S. Attorney for the District of Maine
U.S. Attorney for the District of Maryland (USAO)
U.S. Attorney for the District of Massachusetts
U.S. Attorney for the Eastern District of Michigan
U.S. Attorney for the Western District of Michigan
U.S. Attorney for the District of Minnesota
U.S. Attorney for the Northern District of Mississippi
U.S. Attorney for the Southern District of Mississippi
U.S. Attorney for the Eastern District of Missouri
U.S. Attorney for the Western District of Missouri
U.S. Attorney for the District of Montana
U.S. Attorney for the District of Nebraska
U.S. Attorney for the District of Nevada
U.S. Attorney for the District of New Hampshire
U.S. Attorney for the District of New Jersey (USAO)
U.S. Attorney for the District of New Mexico
U.S. Attorney for the Eastern District of New York (USAO)
U.S. Attorney for the Northern District of New York (USAO)
U.S. Attorney for the Southern District of New York (USAO)
U.S. Attorney for the Western District of New York (USAO)
U.S. Attorney for the Eastern District of North Carolina
U.S. Attorney for the Middle District of North Carolina
U.S. Attorney for the Western District of North Carolina
U.S. Attorney for the District of North Dakota
U.S. Attorney for the Northern District of Ohio
U.S. Attorney for the Southern District of Ohio
U.S. Attorney for the Eastern District of Oklahoma
U.S. Attorney for the Northern District of Oklahoma
U.S. Attorney for the Western District of Oklahoma (USAO)
U.S. Attorney for the District of Oregon
U.S. Attorney for the Eastern District of Pennsylvania
U.S. Attorney for the Middle District of Pennsylvania
U.S. Attorney for the Western District of Pennsylvania
U.S. Attorney for the District of Puerto Rico
U.S. Attorney for the District of Rhode Island
U.S. Attorney for the District of South Carolina
U.S. Attorney for the District of South Dakota (USAO)
U.S. Attorney for the Eastern District of Tennessee
U.S. Attorney for the Middle District of Tennessee
U.S. Attorney for the Western District of Tennessee
U.S. Attorney for the Eastern District of Texas
U.S. Attorney for the Northern District of Texas
U.S. Attorney for the Southern District of Texas
U.S. Attorney for the Western District of Texas
U.S. Attorney for the District of Utah
U.S. Attorney for the District of Vermont
U.S. Attorney for the District of the Virgin Islands
U.S. Attorney for the Eastern District of Virginia
U.S. Attorney for the Western District of Virginia
U.S. Attorney for the Eastern District of Washington
U.S. Attorney for the Western District of Washington
U.S. Attorney for the Northern District of West Virginia
U.S. Attorney for the Southern District of West Virginia
U.S. Attorney for the Eastern District of Wisconsin
U.S. Attorney for the Western District of Wisconsin
U.S. Attorney for the District of Wyoming

Note:  Except as indicated parenthetically, the foregoing links are to the corresponding district court, rather than to the U.S. Attorney's Office.

Defunct U.S. attorneys' offices

 U. S. Attorney for the District of Michigan (February 24, 1863)
 U. S. Attorney for the Eastern District of South Carolina (October 2, 1965)
 U. S. Attorney for the Western District of South Carolina (October 2, 1965)
 U. S. Attorney for the Eastern District of Illinois (October 2, 1978; succeeded by the Central District of Illinois)
 U. S. Attorney for the Panama Canal Zone (March 31, 1982)
 U. S. Attorney for the District of Indiana

See also

 List of United States attorneys appointed by Joe Biden
 List of United States attorneys appointed by Donald Trump
 Dismissal of U.S. attorneys controversy (2007)
 2017 dismissal of U.S. attorneys
 Special counsel
 United States Attorney General
 United States Department of Justice
 Law officers of the Crown

Notes

References

External links

 US Attorneys Office
 United States Attorneys Mission Statement
 United States Attorneys' Manual
 Memorandum on Starting Date for Calculating the Term of an Interim U.S. Attorney
 D.C. Superior Court Division
 Index of prosecuting offices in all state and federal jurisdictions, and some foreign jurisdictions.
 Lawyers New U.S. Attorney

 
United States Department of Justice agencies
Lawyers by type
Prosecution